2002 Urawa Red Diamonds season.

Competitions

Domestic results

J.League 1

Emperor's Cup

J.League Cup

International results

Player statistics

Other pages
 J. League official site

Urawa Red Diamonds
Urawa Red Diamonds seasons